Bolintin may refer to several places in Romania:

Bolintin-Vale, a town in Giurgiu County
Bolintin-Deal, a commune in Giurgiu County